Uranyl chloride refers to inorganic compounds with the formula UO2Cl2(H2O)n where n = 0, 1, or 3.  These are yellow-colored salts.

Synthesis and structures

The hydrates are obtained by dissolving uranyl sulfate or uranyl acetate in hydrochloric acid followed by crystallization from concentrated solutions. Depending on the method of drying, one obtains the mono- or the trihydrate. The monohydrate is described as a yellow, sulfur-like powder. It is very hygroscopic. The trihydrate is greenish-yellow.  Both hydrates are fluorescent solids that are highly soluble in water.

The anhydrous material can be obtained by the reaction of oxygen with uranium tetrachloride:
UCl4  +  O2  →  UO2Cl2  +  Cl2

In terms of structures, all three of these compounds feature the uranyl center (trans-UO22+) bound to five additional ligands, which can include (bridging) chloride, water, or another uranyl oxygen.

Reactions
The aquo ligands can be replaced by a variety of donors, e.g. THF.

Industrial importance
The company Indian Rare Earths Limited (IREL) has developed a process to extract uranium from the Western and Eastern coastal dune sands of India. The hydroxide concentrate is further digested with concentrated hydrochloric acid to solubilise all hydroxides to form a feed solution composed of chlorides of uranium and other rare earth elements including thorium. The solution is subjected to liquid–liquid extraction with dual solvent systems to produce uranyl chloride and thorium oxalate. The crude uranyl chloride solution is subsequently refined to nuclear grade ammonium diuranate by a purification process involving precipitation and solvent extraction in a nitrate media.

References

External links

Uranyl compounds
Chlorides
Metal halides
Oxychlorides